is a secularist, neo-nationalist ideology in Turkey that is influenced by Kemalism. Until the late 20th century, the word had been used as an equivalent of 'nationalism'. However, in the mid-1990s, it transformed into a ideology led by left-wing nationalists Mümtaz Soysal and Doğu Perinçek.

As a reaction to the rise of a reformist, but staunchly conservative AKP in 2000s,  came up with numerous conspiracy theories. The central theme of these theories is a world-wide conspiracy to destroy Turkey, which is believed to be spearheaded by countries such as United States, EU member states, Greece, Israel, and Armenia, ethnicities such as Greeks, Arabs, and Armenians, and ideologies such as liberalism, anti-nationalist leftism, and Islamism. To further consolidate their claims, the leaders of the ideology sought to 'historically prove' their theories, thus developing Kemalist historiography and radicalizing it. These theories were popularized by media outlets such as Sözcü, a staunch Kemalist and xenophobic newspaper. According to Doğan Gürpınar, the theories are mostly popular among upper-middle-class secular Turks; however, he notes that there is a lack of definitive research on this area.

Notes

See also 
 Nationalitarianism, a French version of 
 National Party (Turkey)
 Patriotic Party (Turkey), Workers' Party (Turkey)

References 

Left-wing nationalism
Political ideologies
Political movements in Turkey
Turkish nationalism
Syncretic political movements